Chairo is a traditional dish of the Aymara people, consumed mainly in Bolivia and other countries in the Andes.

It is a soup made of vegetables and beef. It is made of chuño (dehydrated potatoes), onions, carrots, potatoes, white corn, peas, fava beans, a small piece of châlona (dehydrated lamb or llama meat,)  beef, and wheat kernels and sometimes a small piece of pork rind that goes on top. 
It also contains herbs such as coriander and spices. It is native to the region of La Paz.

See also
 Chilean cuisine
 List of beef dishes
 List of stews

References

Bolivian cuisine
Chilean cuisine
Peruvian cuisine
Meat stews
Beef dishes
Potato dishes